Geastrum melanocephalum is a species of fungus belonging to the family Geastraceae.

Synonym:
 Trichaster melanocephalus Czernajew, 1845

References

Geastraceae